The following is a list of football stadiums in Croatia, ordered by capacity.

Current stadiums
Clubs in bold currently compete in the Croatian Football League.

Future stadiums

Stadiums under construction

See also
List of European stadiums by capacity
List of association football stadiums by capacity

References

 
Croatia
stadiums
Football stadiums